The 1970 Houston Cougars football team represented the University of Houston during the 1970 NCAA University Division football season.

Schedule

Personnel

Season summary

Ole Miss

References

Houston
Houston Cougars football seasons
Houston Cougars football